The following is the qualification system and qualified countries for the Tennis at the 2023 Pan American Games competition.

Qualification system
A total of 82 tennis players will qualify to compete at the Games (41 men and 41 women). Each country is allowed to enter a maximum of three male and three female athletes (with one pair maximum in each of the doubles events). The singles events will consist of 41 men and 41 women respectively, with those athletes competing in the doubles events. The host nation Chile was allowed to enter with a maximum team of 6 athletes, while the remaining spots were distributed using two regional Games and the ATP rankings, WTA rankings and ITF rankings. A further three wildcards for men and women will be also awarded.

Qualification timeline

Qualification summary

Men's singles

Men's doubles

Women's singles

Women's doubles

Mixed doubles

References

Qualification for the 2023 Pan American Games
Qualification
Qualification for tennis tournaments